Jock Jams, Volume 4 is the fourth album in the Jock Jams compilation album series.

Track listing
"Yeah Baby!" – Austin Powers
"Unlimited Megajam" – 2 Unlimited
"Mo Money Mo Problems" – Notorious B.I.G.
"Can You Feel It" – 3rd Party
"Space Jam" – Quad City DJ's
"Watch Out We're Here" – The Jock Jams Cheerleaders
"Raise the Roof" – Luke
"Gettin' Jiggy wit It" – Will Smith
"Everybody (Backstreet's Back)" – Backstreet Boys
"No One Pushes Us Around" – J.K. Simmons
"Going Out of My Head" – Fatboy Slim
"Hear the Organ Get Wicked" – Ray Castoldi	
"Mueve La Cadera (Move Your Body)" – Reel 2 Real
"Push It" – Salt-n-Pepa
"Seventh Inning Stretch" – Bob Sheppard (P.A. Announcer for the N.Y. Yankees)
"Jump Around" – House of Pain
"One More Night" – Amber
"Beautiful Day" – Hypertrophy
"Be Aggressive" – The Jock Jam Cheerleaders
"Get Ready to Bounce" – Brooklyn Bounce
"Tubthumping" – Chumbawamba
"Good Night" – Bob Sheppard
"Son of Jock Jam (Mega Mix)" – Jock Jam All Stars

Charts

Weekly charts

Year-end charts

References

Jock series
1998 compilation albums
Dance music compilation albums
Pop compilation albums
Hip hop compilation albums
Tommy Boy Records compilation albums